Gerald Collins (3 July 1933 – 31 December 2008) was a Canadian boxer. He competed in the men's light heavyweight event at the 1956 Summer Olympics. At the 1956 Summer Olympics, he lost to Ottavio Panunzi of Italy.

References

External links
 

1933 births
2008 deaths
Canadian male boxers
Olympic boxers of Canada
Boxers at the 1956 Summer Olympics
Place of birth missing
Light-heavyweight boxers